The 25th Chess Olympiad, organized by FIDE and comprising an open and a women's tournament, as well as several other events designed to promote the game of chess, took place between October 29 and November 16, 1982, in Lucerne, Switzerland.

The Soviet team with three world champions (reigning champion Karpov, future champion Kasparov and former champion Tal) were back in their usual form and this time left no doubt about the outcome. In the end, they only drew one match (against the Netherlands; and won the rest) and finished no less than 6½ points ahead of runners-up Czechoslovakia. The United States took the bronze medals.

Off the board, FIDE elected a new president at its congress held concurrently with the Olympiad. Friðrik Ólafsson of Iceland was succeeded by Florencio Campomanes of the Philippines.

Open event

A total of 91 nations played a 14-round Swiss system tournament - 93 had applied, but The Gambia and Mauritania did not arrive. To make for an even number of teams, the Swiss hosts also fielded a "B" team. For the first time, the two British Channel Islands, Guernsey and Jersey, participated with a joint team.

In the event of a draw, the tie-break was decided first by using the Buchholz system, then by match points.

{| class="wikitable"
|+ Open event
! # !! Country !! Players !! Averagerating !! Points !! Buchholz !! MP
|-
| style="background:gold;"|1 ||  || Karpov, Kasparov, Polugaevsky, Beliavsky, Tal, Yusupov || 2651 || 42½ || || 
|-
| style="background:silver;"|2 ||  || Hort, Smejkal, Ftáčnik, Jansa, Plachetka, Ambrož || 2539 || 36 || ||
|-
| style="background:#cc9966;"|3 ||  || Browne, Seirawan, Alburt, Kavalek, Tarjan, Christiansen || 2580 || 35½ || ||
|-
| 4 ||  || Ljubojević, Gligorić, Kovačević, Velimirović, Ivanović, Hulak || 2554 || 35 ||  || 
|-
| 5 ||  || Portisch, Ribli, Sax, Pintér, Csom, Grószpéter || 2579 || 33½ || 461.5 || 
|-
| 6 ||  || Tringov, Radulov, Velikov, Inkiov, Donchev, Popov || 2475 || 33½ || 431.5 || 
|-
| 7 ||  || Sznapik, Schmidt, Kuligowski, Adamski, Bielczyk, Sygulski || 2459 || 33 ||  || 
|-
| 8 ||  || Kristiansen, Mortensen, Fedder, Øst-Hansen, Fries-Nielsen || 2433 || 32½ || 442.5 || 
|-
| 9 ||  || García González, Nogueiras, Rodríguez Céspedes, Hernández, García Martínez, Vilela || 2483 || 32½ || 432.5 || 
|-
| 10 ||  || Miles, Nunn, Speelman, Stean, Mestel, Chandler || 2561 || 32 || 456.5 || 
|-
| 11 ||  || Quinteros, Cámpora, Hase, Rubinetti, Bronstein, Gómez Baillo || 2458 || 32 || 447.0 || 
|-
| 12 ||  || Gheorghiu, Șubă, Ciocâltea, Ghindă, Stoica, Foișor || 2488 || 32 || 442.0 || 
|-
| 13 ||  || Gruenfeld, Murey, Gutman, Birnboim, Greenfeld, Kagan || 2475 || 32 || 432.0 || 
|-
| 14 ||  || Hölzl, Herzog, Wittmann, Danner, Baumgartner || 2396 || 32 || 421.5 || 
|-
| 15 ||  || Hübner, Unzicker, Pfleger, Lobron, Hecht, Kindermann || 2518 || 31½ || 456.5 || 
|-
| 16 ||  || Andersson, Schüssler, Karlsson, Schneider, Wedberg, Ornstein || 2518 || 31½ || 451.0 || 
|-
| 17 ||  || Timman, Sosonko, Ree, van der Wiel, van der Sterren, Ligterink || 2546 || 31½ || 448.0 || 
|-
| 18 ||  || Ivanov, Suttles, Hébert, Day, Pelts, Berry || 2453 || 31½ || 441.0 || 
|-
| 19 ||  || Torre, Mascariñas, Maninang, Yap, Cain, Lupian || 2428 || 31½ || 411.5 || 
|-
| 20 ||  || Zapata, Alzate, Gutierrez, Agudelo, Cuartas, Mendoza || 2371 || 31½ || 402.5 || 
|-
| 21 ||  || Morovic, Frias Pablaza, Cifuentes, Campos Moreno, Salazar Jacob, Abarca Aguirre || 2425 || 31 ||  || 
|-
| 22 ||  || Rogers, Jamieson, West, Johansen, Shaw, Hjorth || 2355 || 30½ || 432.5 || 
|-
| 23 ||  || Sigurjónsson, Árnason, H. Ólafsson, Pétursson, Hjartarson, Jóhannsson || 2446 || 30½ || 415.0 || 
|-
| 24 ||  || Helmers, Heim, Vinje-Gulbrandsen, Agdestein, Bjerke, Hoen || 2383 || 30½ || 414.0 || 
|-
| 25 ||  || Rantanen, Westerinen, Mäki, Binham, Yrjölä, Raaste || 2394 || 30½ || 398.0 || 
|-
| 26 ||  || Korchnoi, Hug, Wirthensohn, Partoş, Züger, Franzoni || 2479 || 30 || 451.0 || 
|-
| 27 ||  || Ardiansyah, Handoko, Adianto, Miolo, Ginting, Fauzi || 2320 || 30 || 430.5 || 
|-
| 28 ||  || Díez del Corral, Bellón López, Fernández García, Martín González, Sanz Alonso, Ochoa de Echagüen || 2425 || 30 || 418.5 || 20
|-
| 29 ||  || Haïk, Kouatly, Giffard, Seret, D. Roos, Andruet || 2414 || 30 || 418.5 || 17
|-
| 30 ||  || Williams, Cooper, Jones, Lamford, Cunningham || 2310 || 30 || 407.5 || 
|-
| 31 ||  || Dunne, Delaney, Short, Doyle, Wallace, Barry || 2243 || 30 || 398.5 || 
|-
| - ||  "B" || Trepp, Gobet, Bhend, Huss, Känel, Vucenovic || 2303 || 30 || 397.0 || 
|-
| 32 ||  || McKay, McNab, Condie, Upton, Swanson, Bryson || 2324 || 29½ || 422.5 || 
|-
| 33 ||  || Skembris, Skalkotas, Kourkounakis, Gavrilakis, Liverios, Trikaliotis || 2343 || 29½ || 412.5 || 
|-
| 34 ||  || Myagmarsuren, Jigjidsüren, Hurelbaatar, Lhagva || 2294 || 29½ || 409.5 || 
|-
| 35 ||  || Abreu, Liao Yuan Eu, Mateo, Gonzáles, Domínguez, Pérez Nivar || 2334 || 29½ || 408.5 || 
|-
| 36 ||  || Fernández, Palacios Lanza, Ostos, Guerra, Urbaneja, Gamboa || 2344 || 29½ || 399.0 || 
|-
| 37 ||  || Liu Wenzhe, Liang Jinrong, Li Zunian, Ye Jiangchuan, Zhang Weida || 2395 || 29 || 426.5 || 
|-
| 38 ||  || Sunye Neto, Paolozzi da Cunha, Segal, Trois, Milos, van Riemsdijk || 2424 || 29 || 412.5 || 
|-
| 39 ||  || Frey, Sisniega, Villarreal, Campos López, Aldrete Lobo || 2426 || 29 || 409.0 || 16
|-
| 40 ||  || Muço, Qendro, Zadrima, Sula, Karkanaqe, Nasto  || 2285 || 29 || 409.0 || 13
|-
| 41 ||  || Thipsay, Ravisekhar, Nagendra, N. R. Anil Kumar, Khan, Parameswaran || 2390 || 28½ || 419.0 || 
|-
| 42 ||  || Passerotti, Messa, Arlandi, Sanna, Ceschia, Cocozza || 2323 || 28½ || 397.0 || 
|-
| 43 ||  || Leow, Wong Meng Kong, Chia Chee Seng, Chan Peng Kong, Tan Chee Keon, Lim Kok Ann || 2306 || 28½ || 396.5 || 
|-
| 44 ||  || Rivera Kuzawka, Dienavorian Lacherian, Bauzá Ortiz, Izquierdo Saravia, Wernik Oliva, Escofet Fernández || 2218 || 28½ || 390.0 || 
|-
| 45 ||  || Small, Sarapu, Nokes, Dowden, Smith, Stuart || 2289 || 28 || 412.5 || 
|-
| 46 ||  || Afifi, Fatin, El-Said, Yassin, El-Ghazali, Abdelnabbi || 2253 || 28 || 393.0 || 
|-
| 47 ||  || Onat, Sel, Durlu, Öney, Süer, Asaturoğlu || 2265 || 28 || 388.5 || 
|-
| 48 ||  || Rodas Martini, Juárez Flores, Pérez, Reyes Nájera, Batres, Deras Díaz || 2293 || 28 || 378.0 || 17
|-
| 49 ||  || D. H. C. Aturupane, Parakrama, Goonetilleke, G. H. A. Aturupane, T. D. R. Peires, Pitigala || 2214 || 28 || 378.0 || 14
|-
| 50 ||  || Weemaes, Goormachtigh, Defize, De Bruycker, Pergericht, Schumacher || 2303 || 27½ || 403.5 || 
|-
| 51 ||  || L. Santos, J. P. Santos, Silva, Fernandes, Durão, A. P. Santos || 2353 || 27½ || 386.5 || 
|-
| 52 ||  || Franco Ocampos, Gamarra Cáceres, Valiente, Bogda, Santacruz, Sosa Harrison || 2294 || 27½ || 378.0 || 
|-
| 53 ||  || Hakki, Beitar, Houshan, Argha, Hamwieh || 2248 || 27½ || 375.5 || 
|-
| 54 ||  || Sinprayoon, Trisa-Ard, Chaivichit, Rittiphunyawong, Ruenwongsa, Kavakul || 2328 || 27 || 390.0 || 
|-
| 55 ||  || Khan, Farooqui, Hussain, Mohiuddin, Mirza, Zafar || 2256 || 27 || 387.5 || 
|-
| 56 ||  || Hansen, Apol, Ziska, T. Nielsen, Midjord, Joensen || 2200 || 27 || 368.5 || 
|-
| 57 ||  || Liew Chee Meng, Hon Kah Seng, Goh Yoon Wah, Choong Yit Chuan, Quah Seng Sun, A. Annvar Bin Zainal || 2226 || 26½ || 385.0 || 
|-
| 58 ||  || Jhunjhnuwala, Jhunjhnuwala, Luk Luen Wah, Schepel, Lin, Latham || 2251 || 26½ || 374.0 || 
|-
| 59 ||  || Sursock, Abouchaaya, El-Khechen, Narchi, Loheac-Ammoun || 2211 || 26½ || 372.5 || 
|-
| 60 ||  || Falcón, Santa Torres, Martínez Buitrago, Moraza Choisme, Ochoa, Davila Vega || 2208 || 26 || 383.5 || 
|-
| 61 ||  || Takemoto, Nishimura, Matsumoto, Kaya, Yuuki, Shintani || 2200 || 26 || 365.5 || 
|-
| 62 ||  || Bouaziz, Kaabi, Graa, Ouechtati, Belkhodja, Zargouni || 2240 || 25½ || 389.5 || 
|-
| 63 ||  || Tavares, Cecil Lee, Courtney Lee, Duchesne, Ramon-Fortune, Raphael || 2204 || 25½ || 369.0 || 
|-
| 64 ||  || Arrata, Vintimilla, Matamoros Franco, Delgado, Yépez Jaramillo, M. Pinoargote || 2214 || 25½ || 364.5 || 
|-
| 65 ||  || Benhadi, Slimani, Chaourar, Telmoune, Kharchi, Bammoune || 2200 || 25½ || 363.5 || 
|-
| 66 ||  || Riza, Martidis, Demetrakis, Avgousti, Schinis || 2213 || 25½ || 363.0 || 
|-
| 67 ||  || Purgimón, Santamaría Mas, D. Iglesias, Pantebre Martínez, Clua Ballague, De la Casa || 2200 || 25½ || 362.5 || 
|-
| 68 ||  || Barlow, Glazier, Kuwaza, Levy, Rahman, Kyriakides || 2200 || 25½ || 360.5 || 
|-
| 69 ||  || Lindeboom, Koenders, Tjongtjinjoe, Hoefdraad, Kuslan, Veer || 2200 || 25½ || 354.5 || 
|-
| 70 ||  and  || Blow, Fulton, Knight, Watkins, Cummins || 2200 || 25½ || 352.0 || 
|-
| 71 ||  || Rush, Pilapil, Marko, Markov, Baker, Fancy || 2200 || 25½ || 351.5 || 
|-
| 72 ||  || Camilleri, Azzopardi, Lauri, Cilia Vincenti, Sollars, Zaffarese || 2205 || 25½ || 347.5 || 
|-
| 73 ||  || M. Saleh, Sharif, Shuhail, N. M. Saleh, Razaq || 2200 || 25½ || 345.5 || 
|-
| 74 ||  || Girault, Angles d'Auriac, Merqui, Lepine, Lorinczi Retek, Zapuzek || 2200 || 25½ || 341.5 || 
|-
| 75 ||  || Caiafas, I. Onime, Agusto, O. Faseyitan || 2200 || 25 || 367.5 || 
|-
| 76 ||  || Feller, Stull, Schammo, Bastian, Wietor, Goerens || 2211 || 25 || 346.5 || 
|-
| 77 ||  || Kamuhangire, Zabasajja, Zirembuzi, Mpeka, Okoth, Mungyereza || 2200 || 25 || 334.5 || 
|-
| 78 ||  || De Vries, Vandecastele, Buysschaert, Behrenfelt, Claeys || 2200 || 25 || 330.5 || 
|-
| 79 ||  Libya || Abdulatif, M. Hingary, El-Mejbri, El-Ageli, Amer, El-Gheiadi || 2200 || 24½ ||  || 
|-
| 80 ||  || Tonsingh, Wheeler, Powell, Ewbank, Matthews || 2200 || 24 || 364.5 || 
|-
| 81 ||  || Bakr, Bukhari, Battikhi, Zu'bi, Arafat || 2200 || 24 || 348.0 || 
|-
| 82 ||  || Sakho, Sargos, S. Mbaye, Diop, P. Sakho || 2200 || 24 || 334.0 || 
|-
| 83 ||  || Hook, Jarecki, Solomon, Pickering, Walters || 2209 || 23 ||  || 
|-
| 84 ||  || Ustariz, López, Yuja, Luque, Zaldivar, Díaz || 2200 || 22½ || 325.5 || 
|-
| 85 ||  || Van Tilbury, Turner, Chiu Yum San, Grumer, Carty, W. Grolemund || 2201 || 22½ || 320.5 || 
|-
| 86 ||  || Faroghi, A. Hamid Khonji, Rashid, Said, K. Mohsin, Al-Khozai || 2200 || 22½ || 316.0 || 
|-
| 87 ||  || Nascimento, de Carvalho, De Meireles, Veloso, Ferreira, Sousa || 2200 || 22 || 319.5 || 
|-
| 88 ||  || Kanani, Adam, Miheso, Pravinlal Nandlal, Anilkumar Ramanlal || 2200 || 22 || 289.5 || 
|-
| 89 ||  || Wojciechowski, Harris, Radford, Tee, Chudleigh, Dill || 2200 || 19½ ||  || 
|-
| 90 ||  || Blackburn, Hamley, Thobosi, Abdulla, Madikwe, Kgatshe || 2200 || 14½ || 325.0 || 
|-
| 91 ||  || Mwanse, Sikazwe, Salimu, N. Kawanu, Ndlhovu Vuto, Kafumbwe || 2200 || 14½ || 322.5 || 
|}

Individual medals

 Board 1:  Zenón Franco Ocampos 11 / 13 = 84.6%
 Board 2:  Rico Mascariñas 7½ / 9 = 83.3%
 Board 3:  Carlos Matamoros Franco 7 / 9 = 77.8%
 Board 4:  Simen Agdestein 9 / 12 = 75.0%
 1st reserve:  Daniël Roos 9 / 11 = 81.8%
 2nd reserve:  Stuart Fancy 8 / 9 = 88.9%

Women's event

45 nations were signed up, and to make for an even number of teams, the Swiss hosts also fielded a "B" team. However, the Dominican Republic never showed up, so the competition ended up consisting of an odd 45 teams after all.

In the event of a draw, the tie-break was decided first by using the Buchholz system, then by match points.

Like the open event, the women's tournament was dominated by the Soviet Union, captained by world champion Chiburdanidze, who won the gold medals by a three-point margin. Romania and Hungary took silver and bronze, respectively.

{| class="wikitable"
! # !! Country !! Players !! Averagerating !! Points !! Buchholz
|-
| style="background:gold;"|1 ||  || Chiburdanidze, Alexandria, Gaprindashvili, Ioseliani || 2360 || 33 ||
|-
| style="background:silver;"|2 ||  || Mureșan, Pogorevici, Nuțu-Terescenko, Polihroniade || 2297 || 30 ||
|-
| style="background:#cc9966;"|3 ||  || Verőci-Petronić, Ivánka, Porubszky-Angyalosine, Csonkics || 2205 || 26 ||
|-
| 4 ||  || Ereńska-Radzewska, Brustman, Wiese, Szmacińska || 2153 || 25½ || 
|-
| 5 ||  || Liu Shilan, Wu Mingqian, An Yangfeng || 2090 || 24½ || 342.5
|-
| 6 ||  || Hund, Fischdick, Feustel, Laakmann || 2185 || 24½ || 340.0
|-
| 7 ||  || Cramling, Borisova-Ornstein, Aatolainen, Nyberg || 2122 || 24 || 
|-
| 8 ||  || Vreeken, Bruinenberg, Belle, van Parreren || 2058 || 23½ || 321.0
|-
| 9 ||  || R. Khadilkar, J. Khadilkar, V. Khadilkar, Thipsay || 2007 || 23½ || 299.5
|-
| 10 ||  || García Vicente, García Padrón, Gallego Eraso, Ferrer Lucas || 2112 || 23 || 341.0
|-
| 11 ||  || Miles, Jackson, Groves, Needham || 2083 || 23 || 337.0
|-
| 12 ||  || Lazarević, Nikolin, Maksimović, Maček || 2165 || 23 || 333.5
|-
| 13 ||  || Tagnon, Ruck-Petit, Lebel-Arias, Boulongne || 1927 || 23 || 297.5
|-
| 14 ||  || Lematschko, Bojadjieva, Voyska, Angelova || 2143 || 22½ || 335.5
|-
| 15 ||  || Guggenberger, Salazar Varón, Maya de Alzate, Leyva || 1975 || 22½ || 311.5
|-
| 16 ||  || Jussara Chaves, Ribeiro, Joara Chaves, Cardoso || 1892 || 22½ || 303.5
|-
| 17 ||  || Savereide, Haring, Lanni, Crotto || 2110 || 22 || 339.0
|-
| 18 ||  || Pernici, Iacono, Deghenghi, Moscatiello || 1875 || 22 || 306.0
|-
| 19 ||  || Shterenberg, Roos, Baltgailis, Mongeau || 1953 || 22 || 302.5
|-
| 20 ||  || Hulgana, P. Buzhinlham, Sh. Batcengel || 1800 || 22 || 299.5
|-
| 21 ||  || Slavotinek, Martin, Clementi, Travers || 1885 || 22 || 292.0
|-
| 22 ||  || Nika, Kondou, Firigou, K. Mihailidou || 1802 || 22 || 235.0
|-
| 23 ||  || Soppe, Justo, Burijovich, Rizzo || 1953 || 21½ || 305.5
|-
| 24 ||  || Tamin, Wijayanti, Mun, S. Punyanan || 1802 || 21½ || 287.0
|-
| 25 ||  || Torsteinsdóttir, Tráinsdóttir, Friðþjófsdóttir, Kristinsdóttir || 1813 || 21 || 306.0
|-
| 26 ||  || Veprek, Bürgin, Baumann, Steiner || 1905 || 21 || 294.5
|-
| 27 ||  || Cartel, Fontanilla, Palacios || 1833 || 21 || 265.5
|-
| 28 ||  || Stretch, Burndred, Martin, Sievey || 1800 || 21 || 219.5
|-
| 29 ||  || Hennings, Hausner, Dür, Kattinger || 1945 || 20½ || 301.0
|-
| 30 ||  || Glaz, Schwartz, Gal, A. Inbar || 1928 || 20½ || 297.0
|-
| 31 ||  || Milligan, Condie, Hindle, Morrison || 1820 || 20½ || 294.5
|-
| 32 ||  || Landry, Laitinen, Pihlajamäki, Ristoja || 1923 || 20½ || 254.0
|-
| 33 ||  || Acevedo, Carvajal, Salazar || 1843 || 20½ || 231.5
|-
| 34 ||  || De Corte, Careme, Schumacher, Maseyczik || 1800 || 20 || 
|-
| 35 ||  || Takahashi, Watai, Nakagawa, Kamijima || 1860 || 19½ || 294.0
|-
| - ||  "B" || Küng, Leu, Schladetzky, Eigenmann || 1848 || 19½ || 279.0
|-
| 36 ||  || Gülümser Yılmaz, Arbil, Gülsevil Yılmaz, Yardımıcı || 1838 || 19½ || 253.5
|-
| 37 ||  || De Francisco, Niño del Táchira, Delgado, García La Rosa || 1853 || 19½ || 244.5
|-
| 38 ||  || Evans, Anson, Brunker, James || 1815 || 18½ || 248.0
|-
| 39 ||  || Klingen, Dahl, Birkestrand, Kumle || 1800 || 18½ || 243.5
|-
| 40 ||  || Connolly, Martin, Delaney, Murphy || 1800 || 18½ || 220.0
|-
| 41 ||  || Basta Sohair, A. Samy Maha, Ibrahim, Farag || 1800 || 16½ || 
|-
| 42 ||  || Moheni, Belmar, M. Geofroy, R. Geofroy || 1800 || 11½ || 
|-
| 43 ||  || Mbuye, E. Mzyece, Mulenga || 1800 || 5½ || 
|-
| 44 ||  || Widmer, Quenzel, F. Jankowski, N. Fodiaba || 1800 || 4 || 
|}

Individual medals

 Board 1:  Barbara Pernici 9½ / 12 = 79.2%
 Board 2:  Nana Alexandria 7½ / 9 = 83.3%
 Board 3:  Daniela Nuțu-Terescenko 11 / 12 = 91.7%
 Reserve:  Elisabeta Polihroniade and  Teresa Leyva 7 / 9 = 77.8%

References

25th Chess Olympiad: Lucerne 1982 OlimpBase

25
Women's Chess Olympiads
Olympiad 25
Chess Olympiad 25
Olympiad 25
Chess Olympiad 25
Chess Olympiad 25
Chess Olympiad 25